66 Aquarii is a single star in the equatorial constellation of Aquarius. 66 Aquarii is the Flamsteed designation though the star also bears the Bayer designation of g1 Aquarii. It is visible to the naked eye as a faint, orange-hued star with an apparent visual magnitude of 4.673.

This is an evolved giant star with a stellar classification of K3 III. It has expanded to 37 times the radius of the Sun and is radiating 434 times the luminosity of the Sun from its outer envelope at an effective temperature of 4,170 K. This gives it the orange-hued glow of a K-type star. It is a suspected variable star that ranges in magnitude between 4.66 and 4.71.

References

External links
 Image 66 Aquarii

K-type giants
Suspected variables
Aquarius (constellation)
BD-19 6324
Aquarii, g1
Aquarii, 066
215167
112211
8649